K. exigua may refer to:

 Kazachstania exigua, a yeast used in the production of sourdough
 Kyllinga exigua, a flowering plant